The Agassiz Glacier is located near the west coast of New Zealand's South Island. The Agassiz Glacier is a tributary of the larger Franz Josef Glacier, and is itself fed by the Chamberlin Snowfield and the Davis Snowfield. It is named after Louis Agassiz, a Swiss-American glaciologist, and was discovered and named by the German geologist, Sir Johann "Julius" von Haast.

In 2015 the glacier was informally 'unnamed' as part of a worldwide campaign to disassociate Agassiz's name from various geographic features and, in this instance, to replace it with a relevant Māori name.

References

External links 
 Agassiz Glacier on NZ Topo Map
 Agassiz Glacier on Mapcarta.com

Glaciers of New Zealand
Westland Tai Poutini National Park